Gabin may refer to:

Gabin (surname)
Saint Gabinus, name of two Christian martyrs
Jean Gabin, a French actor
Gabin Dabiré, Burkinabé musician
Jean-Gabin Moubeke (born 1982), Ivorian footballer

Music
Gabin (Italian band)
Gabin, a Mirmo! character

Places
Gąbin, a town in Poland
Gąbin, Kuyavian-Pomeranian Voivodeship, a village in north-central Poland
Gąbin, West Pomeranian Voivodeship, a village in north-west Poland
Gąbin, the Polish name for Gusev, Kaliningrad Oblast, Russia